The third season of the animated show Metalocalypse originally aired on Adult Swim from November 8, 2009 to October 24, 2010 with 10 episodes. The show follows virtual death metal band Dethklok. This season featured a 22-minute runtime (30 with commercials).

Many of the songs played by Dethklok throughout this season were released as part of the album Dethalbum III in 2012. Additionally, several episodes featured musical numbers sung by members of Dethklok.

In May 2015, this season became available on Hulu Plus.

Guests
This season featured guest voice actors from musicians such as Kirk Hammett of Metallica, Slash, Scott Ian of Anthrax, Joe Satriani, Steve Vai, Ace Frehley, Matt Pike of High on Fire, Dave Grohl of Foo Fighters, Brann Dailor, Brent Hinds, and Troy Sanders of Mastodon, and Grutle Kjellson, Arve Isdal, and Herbrand Larsen of  Enslaved. Actress Frankie Ingrassia and comedians Laraine Newman and Andy Richter also appeared as voice actors.

Special features
Disc One
General Crozier/Falconback teaser
Whack-a-Clown ("Dethzazz" extended scene)

Disc Two
Dimmu Burger Drive Thru
"Places" with FaceBones
House Cleaning ("Renovationklok" extended scene)
Furniture ("Renovationklok" deleted scene)
Immortal Records ("Renovationklok" extended scene)
Klokateer Recruitment Videos 1–4
Escort Services ("Fertilityklok" extended scene)
Drunk ("DethHealth" extended scene)
Snacks ("Renovationklok" extended scene)
Two Swedish Dads Extended Cut ("Fatherklok" extended scene)
Murderface dance sequence
Tribunal janitor
Offdensen palling around 

Blu-ray Exclusives
Nathan Reading Shakespeare's "Othello"
Music videos:
Bloodlines
Dethsupport
The Gears
Burn the Earth
Black Fire Upon Us

Production
Every episode of this season was 22 minutes long, as opposed to the 11 minute episodes from season one and two. Show creator Brendon Small wanted to use this extra air time to focus on character development and giving several main characters an episode dedicated to them. This was also the first season to be released on Blu-ray.

Comedian Brian Posehn helped write an episode this season; he would later go on to become a main writer for season four.

This was the first Metalocalypse home media release to be uncensored.

Episodes

See also

 List of Adult Swim home videos

References

2009 American television seasons
2010 American television seasons
Metalocalypse seasons